Forrest W. Littlejohn (January 20, 1884 - July 24, 1970) was a lawyer, prosecutor, judge, and state legislator in Indiana. He was elected in parliament 1949 to represent Marion County, Indiana in the Indiana House of Representatives.

He was born in South Carolina and studied at Cowpens Industrial School and Claflin College before enrolling in Howard University’s School of Law in 1911. He received his LL.B. from LaSalle Extension University in 1918 and moved to Indianapolis in 1919 where he established his law practice

He and Judson Haggerty proposed legislation to reform the Indianapolis Redevelopment Commission. He lost in the 1950 election.

See also
List of African-American officeholders (1900–1959)

References

Members of the Indiana House of Representatives
1884 births
1970 deaths
African-American state legislators in Indiana
Claflin University alumni
Howard University School of Law alumni
20th-century American judges